Hallila is a suburb in Tampere, Finland. Hallila is located between Korkinmäki and Hervanta near Highway 9. Approximately 4,000 people live in Hallila.

In Hallila there is a grocery store, a pizzeria, a hairdresser, and a pub. Services provided by the city or the church include an elementary school (grades 1 - 4), a kindergarten, and a church.

Hallila was built mostly during the 1990s. Bus lines 6 and 12 operate through Hallila to Hervanta, Hatanpää and the centre of Tampere.

Districts of Tampere